William Tannatt Foulkes (1863 – 8 February 1937) was a Welsh international footballer. He was part of the Wales national football team between 1884 and 1885, playing 2 matches. He played his first match on 9 February 1884 against Ireland and his last match on 23 March 1885 against Scotland.

See also
 List of Wales international footballers (alphabetical)

References

External links
 
 

1863 births
1937 deaths
Welsh footballers
Wales international footballers
Date of birth missing
Association football defenders
Oswestry Town F.C. players